The treenailed boat is a boat model used in Northern Europe, usually associated with Vikings but should perhaps be ascribed to Pomeranian groups. The shape and construction coincides with the sewn boats, but instead of ropes, it is assembled with wooden treenails.

See also
Lashed-lug boat
Mtepe

References
Mike McCarthy. (September 14, 2005) Ships' Fastenings: From Sewn Boat to Steamship Texas A&M University Press  pg. 65

Boat types